English rarely uses diacritics, which are symbols indicating the modification of a vowel's sound when spoken. Most of the affected words are in terms  imported from other languages The two dots accent (diaeresis or umlaut), the grave accent and the acute accent are the only diacritics native to Modern English, and their usage has tended to fall off except in certain publications and particular cases.

Proper nouns are not generally counted as English terms except when accepted into the language as an eponym – such as Geiger–Müller tube, or the English terms roentgen after Wilhelm Röntgen, and biro after László Bíró, in which case any diacritical mark is often lost.

Unlike continental European languages, English orthography tends to use digraphs (like "sh", "oo", and "ea") rather than diacritics to indicate more sounds than can be accommodated by the letters of the Latin alphabet.  Unlike other systems (such as Spanish orthography) where the spelling indicates the pronunciation, English spelling is highly varied, and diacritics alone would be insufficient to make it reliably phonetic.  (See .)

Types of diacritical marks

Though limited, the following diacritical marks in English may be encountered, particularly for marking in poetry:
 the acute accent (née) and grave accent (English poetry marking, changèd), modifying vowels or marking stresses
 the circumflex (entrepôt), borrowed from French
 the diaeresis (Zoë), indicating a second syllable in two consecutive vowels
 the tittle, the dot found on the regular small i and small j, is removed when another diacritic is required
 the macron (English poetry marking, lēad pronounced , not ), lengthening vowels, as in Māori; or indicating omitted n or m (in pre-Modern English, both in print and in handwriting).
 the breve (English poetry marking, drŏll pronounced , not ), shortening vowels
 the umlaut (über), altering Germanic vowels
 the cedilla (soupçon), in French, Portuguese and in Catalan it is a softening c, indicating 's-' not 'k-' pronunciation
 the tilde (Señor, João), in Spanish indicating palatalised n, and Portuguese indicating nasal a and o (although in Spanish and most source languages, the tilde is not considered a diacritic over the letter n but rather as an integral part of the distinct letter ñ; in Portuguese the sound is represented by "nh")
In representing European personal names, anthroponyms, and place names, toponyms, the following are often encountered:
 the háček (as in Karel Čapek), often also called the haček in English (adapted from "háček", the Czech name ), as Č/č, Š/š, Ř/ř (only in Czech), Ž/ž broadly turns "c" "s" "r" "z" into English "" "" "" ""  sounds respectively, and Ď/ď, Ľ/ľ (only in Slovak), Ň/ň and Ť/ť turn "" "" "" and "" into palatal "" "" "" and "" sounds. In most fonts the caron looks like an apostrophe sitting inside the Slovak capital L, as "Ľ", but in fact is only another form of caron.
 the Polish crossed Ł and ogonek (as in Lech Wałęsa) – the former pronounced as English "w", the latter with varying pronunciation (see Ę and Ą)
 the Serbo-Croatian Latin crossed Đ (as in Franjo Tuđman or Zoran Đinđić), equivalent to the Cyrillic letter Dje 
 the Maltese crossed Ħ (as in the Ħal- town prefix, Ħal Far Industrial Estate), a hard H
 the Danish and Norwegian crossed Ø (as in Galdhøpiggen); the front rounded O, which is written with an umlaut in Swedish and German
 the Norwegian, Danish and Swedish over-ring Å (as in Åland), the å vowel sound (usually )
 the Romanian Ș (as in Chișinău), the voiceless postalveolar fricative
For a more complete list see diacritical marks.

Special characters
Some sources distinguish "diacritical marks" (marks upon standard letters in the A–Z 26-letter alphabet) from "special characters" (letters not marked but radically modified from the standard 26-letter alphabet) such as Old English and Icelandic eth (Ð, ð) and thorn (uppercase Þ, lowercase þ), and ligatures such as Latin and Anglo-Saxon Æ (minuscule: æ), and German eszett (ß; final -ß, often -ss even in German and always in Swiss Standard German).

The reverse of "special characters" is when foreign digraphs, such as Welsh ll in Llanelli, Dutch ij, or Croatian nj (same in Serbian and Bosnian) are simply treated as two standard A–Z characters.

Native English words
In some cases, the diacritic is not borrowed from any foreign language but is purely of English origin. The second of two vowels in a hiatus can be marked with a diaeresis (or "tréma") – as in words such as coöperative, daïs and reëlect – but its use has become less common, sometimes being replaced by the use of a hyphen. The New Yorker and MIT Technology Review under Jason Pontin have maintained such usage as house styles.

The diaeresis mark is also in rare cases used over a single vowel to show that it is pronounced separately (as in Brontë). It is often omitted in printed works because the sign is missing on modern keyboards.

The acute and grave accents are occasionally used in poetry and lyrics: the acute to indicate stress overtly where it might be ambiguous (rébel vs. rebél) or nonstandard for metrical reasons (caléndar); the grave to indicate that an ordinarily silent or elided syllable is pronounced (warnèd, parlìament).

In historical versions of English

The Old English Latin alphabet began to replace the Runic alphabet in the 8th century, due to the influence of Celtic Christian missionaries to the Anglo-Saxon kingdoms.  The orthography of Old English – which was entirely handwritten in its own time – was not well standardized, though it did not use all the Latin letters, and included several letters not present in the modern alphabet.  When reprinted in modern times, an overdot is occasionally used with two Latin letters to differentiate sounds for the reader:
 ċ is used for a voiceless palato-alveolar affricate /t͡ʃ/
 ġ for a palatal approximant /j/ (probably a voiced palatal fricative /ʝ/ in the earliest texts)

Some modern printings also apply diacritics to vowels following the rules of Old Norse normalized spelling developed in the 19th century.

In the Late Middle English period, the shape of the English letter þ (thorn), which was derived from the Runic alphabet, evolved in some handwritten and blackletter texts to resemble the Latin letter y.  The þ shape survived into the era of printing presses only as far as the press of William Caxton.  In later publications, thorn was represented by "y", or by ẏ to distinguish thorn from y.  By the end of the Early Modern English period, thorn had been completely replaced in contemporary usage by the digraph "th" (reviving a practice from early Old English), and the overdot was no longer needed outside of printings of very old texts.  The overdot is missing from the only surviving usage of a Y-shaped thorn, in the archaic stock phrase ye olde (from "þe olde", pronounced "the old", but "ye olde" is often misanalyzed and pronounced with the modern "y" sound).

Words imported from other languages 
Loanwords, or sometimes more precisely called borrowed words, have enter the English language from other, foreign, languages by a process of naturalisation, or specifically anglicisation, which is carried out mostly unconsciously (a similar process occurs in all other languages). During this process there is a tendency for adapt the original word: this includes accents and other diacritics being dropped (for example French hôtel and French rôle becoming "hotel" and "role" respectively in English, or French à propos, which lost both the accent and space to become English "apropos").

In many cases, imported words can be found in print in both their accented and unaccented versions. Since modern dictionaries are mostly descriptive and no longer prescribe outdated forms, they increasingly list unaccented forms, though some dictionaries, such as the Oxford English Dictionary, do not list the unaccented variants of particular words (e.g., soupçon).

Words that retain their accents often do so to help indicate pronunciation (e.g. frappé, naïve, soufflé), or to help distinguish them from an unaccented English word (e.g. exposé vs. expose, résumé vs. resume, rosé vs. rose). Technical terms or those associated with specific fields (especially cooking or musical terms) are less likely to lose their accents (such as the French soupçon, façade and entrée).

Some Spanish words with the Spanish letter ñ have been naturalised by substituting English ny (e.g., Spanish cañón is now usually English canyon, Spanish piñón is now usually English pinyon pine). Certain words, like piñata, jalapeño and quinceañera, are usually kept intact. In many instances the ñ is replaced with the plain letter n. In words of German origin (e.g. doppelgänger), the letters with umlauts ä, ö, ü may be written ae, oe, ue. This could be seen in many newspapers during World War II, which printed Fuehrer for Führer. However, today umlauts are usually either left out, with no e following the previous letter, or included as written in German (as in The New York Times or The Economist). Zurich is an exception since it is not a case of a "dropped umlaut", but is a genuine English exonym, used also in French (from Latin Turicum)—therefore it may be seen written without the umlaut even alongside other German and Swiss names that retain the umlaut.

Accent-addition and accent-removal
As words are naturalized into English, sometimes diacritics are added to imported words that originally did not have any, often to distinguish them from common English words or to otherwise assist in proper pronunciation. Examples of a partial removal include resumé (from the French résumé) and haček (from the Czech háček) because of the change in pronunciation of the initial vowels. Complete naturalization stripping all diacritics also has occurred, in words such as canyon, from the Spanish cañón. For accurate readings, some speech writers use diacritics to differentiate homographs, such as lēad (pronounced like liːd) and lĕad (pronounced like lɛd). In poetic usage are adjectives such as learnèd and belovèd, which are pronounced with two and three syllables respectively, unlike the past participles learned and beloved, which are each pronounced with one fewer syllable.

Regional differences

Canada

In Canadian English, words of French origin retain their orthography more often than in other English-speaking countries, such as the usage of é (e with acute) in [[café|café]], Montréal, née, Québec, and résumé. This is due to the large influence afforded by French being one of Canada's two official languages at the federal government level as well as at the provincial level in New Brunswick and Manitoba, and the majority and sole official language in Québec.

New Zealand
In New Zealand, loanwords of Maori origin sometimes include the macron that is used in current written Maori. This practice has become widespread, especially since around 2015, following legislation requiring the government to promote the Maori language, and with changing social attitudes as part of the ongoing Maori Renaissance.  This habit is sometimes followed in English outside New Zealand. In Maori, the macron is used to indicate vowel length. In English, the preferred vowel length of these words is indicated in three ways: no change ("Maori"), doubling the vowel ("Maaori"), or using a macron ("Māori"). An umlaut has sometimes been used ("Mäori") in place of a macron where the technical capacity to display a macron is limited. Since 2000, macrons are increasingly common in New Zealand English; both of the main newspaper chains had adopted macrons in their print and online editions in May 2018.

 Regional dialects 
Diacritics have been employed in the orthographies of some regional dialects in England.
 Grave accents and macrons are used in some orthographies of Cumbrian in words such as steàn "stone", seùner "sooner" and pūnd "pound".
 Diaereses are used in the Lincolnshire dialect, for example stoän "stone", goä "go" and maäke "make".
 Grave accents, circumflexes and diaereses are used in the Dorset dialect, in words such as mornèn "morning", drîth "dryness" or "drought" and ceäkes'' "cakes".

Names with diacritics
Diacritics are used in the names of some English-speaking people:
 British: Charlotte Brontë, Emily Brontë (and other members of the Brontë family), Noël Coward, Zoë Wanamaker, Zoë Ball, Emeli Sandé, John le Carré
 American: Beyoncé Knowles, Chloë Grace Moretz, Chloë Sevigny, Renée Fleming, Renée Zellweger, Zoë Baird, Zoë Kravitz, Donté Stallworth, John C. Frémont, Robert M. Gagné, Roxanne Shanté, Janelle Monáe, Jhené Aiko, Louise Glück
 Australian: Renée Geyer, Zoë Badwi

Typographical limitations
The early days of metal type printing quickly faced problems of not just simple diacritical marks for English, and accents for French and German, but also musical notation (for sheet music printing) and Greek and Hebrew alphabets (for Bible printing). However problems with representation of diacritical marks continued even in scholarly publishing and dissertations up to the word processor era.  Mechanical typewriter keyboards manufactured for English-speaking countries seldom include diacritics.

The first generation of word processors also had character set limitations, and confusion due to typesetting convention was exacerbated in the character coded environment due to limitations of the ASCII character set.

See also 
 Lists of English words by country or language of origin
 List of French expressions in English
 List of German expressions in English

Notes

References 

Diacritics
English terms